During World War II, numerous concentration camps existed in the Independent State of Croatia. Most of them were operated by the Croatian Ustaša authorities, but some of them were operated by Nazi Germany and Fascist Italy.

Ustaša-operated camps

German-operated camps
 Sajmište concentration camp
 Sisak
 Vinkovci
 Jankomir

Italian-operated camps
 Kraljevica
 Brač
 Hvar
 Gruž
 Kupari
 Lopud

In annexed territories
 Molat concentration camp
 Rab concentration camp

See also
 List of massacres in the Independent State of Croatia
 Persecution of Serbs in the Independent State of Croatia
 The Holocaust in the Independent State of Croatia

Notes

References

Sources

Books
 
 
 
 
 
 
 

Journals
 

Conference papers and proceedings
 
 

World War II concentration camps in Yugoslavia
 
Holocaust locations in Yugoslavia